Trinitrobenzenesulfonic acid (C6H3N3O9S) is a nitroaryl oxidizing acid. Due to its extreme oxidative properties, if mixed with reducing agents including hydrides, sulfides, and nitrides, it may begin a vigorous reaction that culminates in almost immediate detonation. The aromatic nitro compounds may explode in the presence of a base such as sodium hydroxide or potassium hydroxide even in the presence of water or organic solvents because of the explosive tendencies of aromatic nitro compounds which increase in the presence of multiple nitro groups. Not much is known about this compound, but it is used as a peptide terminal amino group neutralizer and is currently being investigated for its effects on the immune system.

Uses 
Its primary usage is primarily to neutralize peptide terminal amino groups in scientific research. Occasionally it is used as a detonator for certain other explosive compounds.

It is also used to induce colitis in the colon of laboratory animals in order to model inflammatory bowel disease and post-infectious irritable bowel syndrome.

Health concerns and safety precautions 
The primary hazard of working with 2,4,6-trinitrobenzenesulfonic acid is the risk of instantaneous explosion. 2,4,6-Trinitrobenzenesulfonic acid is an extremely sensitive compound especially when mixed with other compounds, exposed to heat, or exposed to rapid temperature or pressure changes. The toxicological properties of this compound have not been investigated, so all health effects are unknown. To best prevent bodily harm or injury it is recommended that all direct contact be avoided and the compound be kept under extremely strict environmentally controlled conditions. In case of spillage it is recommended that a local fire department be called in advance prior to any attempt at cleaning. In case of fire it is recommended that the material be left to burn and the surrounding area be evacuated. If fire fighting is required it is recommended that a fully positive pressure self-contained breathing apparatus be used along with either foam or CO2 extinguishers.

References 

Explosive chemicals
Nitrobenzenes
Benzenesulfonic acids
Liquid explosives